Cuturapi District is one of seven districts of the province Yunguyo in Peru.

History 
The Cuturapi District was created by Law No. 24042 (December 28, 1984), during the second term of Fernando Belaúnde Terry.

Ethnic groups 
The people in the district are mainly indigenous citizens of Aymara descent. Aymara is the language which the majority of the population (68.27%) learnt to speak in childhood, while 30.22% of the residents started speaking using the Spanish language (2007 Peru Census).

Authorities

Mayors 
 2011-2014: Valentín Huanchi Huallpa.
 2007-2010: Humberto Mamani Huanchi.

See also 
 Administrative divisions of Peru
 Qhapiya

References

External links 
 INEI Perú